Odampokki is a distributary of Vettar River flowing in the Tiruvarur district of the Indian state of Tamil Nadu. This river originates near the Engan village and passes through Thiruvarur town. Valavaikal canal branches off from Odampokki river near Ammaiyappan village.

References

See also 
List of rivers of Tamil Nadu

Rivers of Tamil Nadu
Tiruvarur district
Rivers of India